Fortescue Metals Group Limited (often referred to as Fortescue Metals Group, FMG, or simply Fortescue) is an Australian iron ore company. As of 2017, Fortescue is the fourth-largest iron ore producer in the world. The company has holdings of more than 87,000 km2 in the Pilbara region of Western Australia, making it the largest tenement holder in the state, larger than both BHP and Rio Tinto.

Governance
 Andrew "Twiggy" Forrest is chair and owns a third of the company. Elizabeth Gaines is currently the CEO of Fortescue, but Forrest will assume an 'Executive Chairman' role and in effect act as the CEO on an interim basis from August 2022 when Gaines moves into the role of global brand ambassador for the company's renewable energy arm, Fortescue Future Industries until a replacement is found.

Mining projects
The group has two main areas of operation located within the Pilbara region of Western Australia, the Chichester Hub and Solomon Hub. Plans to develop a third, Western Hub were as of 2017 in developmental stage. In 2017 Fortescue started exploration of possible mining tenements in South America and other parts of Australia. FMG engages professional lobbyists to represent their interests to parliaments in multiple jurisdictions. In South Australia, they are represented by Spring Street Advisory Pty Ltd.

Chichester Hub
Located in the heart of the Pilbara, the Chichester Hub is made up of Fortescue's flagship minesite Cloudbreak and the second minesite Christmas Creek. The total Chichester Hub produces 90 million tonnes per annum (mtpa) of iron ore plus an additional five mtpa from a joint venture with BC Iron.

Cloudbreak
Fortescue's first minesite Cloudbreak currently mines 40 million tonnes of iron ore a year. The horizontal nature of the deposits at Cloudbreak called for a new mining approach to those used at other mines which operate on vertical deposits of ore. Overburden removal is done using conventional blast, truck and shovel methods while specially designed surface miners cut and load the ore into trucks for transport to the run of mine stockpiles.
Screening, crushing and desand plants at the Cloudbreak ore processing facility prepare and refine the product before the ore is stockpiled ahead of transport to port. The train loadout facility at Cloudbreak is capable of feeding 16,000 tonnes of ore per hour on the  trains ready for the journey along the  heavy-haul railway to the facilities at Herb Elliott Port.

Christmas Creek
Mining began at Christmas Creek,  to the east of Cloudbreak, in May 2009. Subsequent expansion projects have lifted production capacity to 50 million tonnes per annum.
The operations at Christmas Creek are undergoing expansion and in late 2010 a fifty-kilometre extension to the existing Port Hedland to Cloudbreak rail line was completed to transport the ore to Cloudbreak. The first ore-processing facility (OPF) was commissioned at Christmas Creek in April 2011 with a second OPF commissioned in 2012. As part of the second expansion, a number of additional infrastructure projects were completed, including a  overland conveyor, a new airstrip, an expansion of the power plant and increasing capacity at the operations village to 1,600 rooms.

In January 2013, Fortescue awarded Macmahon Holdings a $1.8 billion mining services contract for its Christmas Creek mine expansion. The Christmas Creek expansion increases the capacity of the Chichester operations to 95 million tons a year, and was a key component of the company's 155-million-tonne-a-year expansion plans.

Solomon Hub

Located in the middle of Fortescue's  Pilbara tenement area, the Solomon Hub was Fortescue's next major project. It has almost twice the resource and less than half the strip ratio of the Chichester Hub. In May 2013, Fortescue officially opened its 20-million-tonne-per-annum (mtpa) Firetail mine at Solomon. In December 2013, the company announced it had achieved first production from its 40 mtpa Kings Valley mine.

The train load out (TLO) facility at Firetail was commissioned in November 2012 and the first ore was transported on the Fortescue Hamersley Rail Line in December 2012. In December 2012 Fortescue opened the  Solomon Railway that connects Solomon to Fortescue's mainline to its port operations.

A third operation within the Solomon hub, the Queens Valley mine, was approved for construction in 2019 at a projected cost of A$417 million. The mine, located 15 km west of the Kings Valley mine, is scheduled to open in 2022.

Eliwana mine 

In May 2018 Fortescue announced a US$1.28 billion development of a new mine in the Pilbara at the Eliwana site. This expansion will include an additional 143 km of railway and a dry ore processing plant capable of processing 30 million tonnes a year. The new mine is expected to have an 18-year lifespan and will be funded from the company's cash flow.

The project is expected create 1,900 construction jobs and 500 permanent full-time positions with production expected to commence in 2020. The Eliwana mine is part of Fortescue's strategy to move to a 60 per cent iron-grade product.

Iron Bridge mine
Scheduled to open 2022, the Iron Bridge mine, located 145 kilometres south of Port Hedland, is projected to produce 22 million tonnes of high-grade 67% magnetite per annum. The project is a joint venture between Fortescue and Formosa Steel, with Baosteel as a minority share holder. The project suffered from cost explosion, with the latest projection of A$4.87 billion being 30 per cent higher than the original estimate.

BC Iron 
BC Iron is a much smaller mining company with iron ore deposits at Nullagine. In 2009, the two companies entered into a 50-50 joint venture in which BC Iron manages mining, crushing and screening, and trucking while Fortescue is contracted to provide haulage and port services to the joint venture. In December 2012 Fortescue sold a 25% stake to BC Iron Ore for A$190 million and agreed to increase the available capacity to the NJV on Fortescue's rail and port infrastructure from the existing 5 million tonnes per annum (mtpa), to 6 mtpa for the life of the joint venture.

Atlas Iron 
In June 2018 Fortescue announced the purchase of 15% of junior iron ore miner Atlas Iron. This brought Fortescue's ownership stakes up to nearly 20%. The acquisition of a controlling interest in Atlas Iron was planned to give Fortescue access to greater port capacity as well as additional higher-grade iron ore tenements. This also potentially allowed a move towards lithium production.

This move was also potentially giving Fortescue access to the North West Infrastructure joint venture. This venture was a collaboration between Atlas Iron, Brockman Mining and FerrAus.

In October 2018, however, Atlas was acquired by Redstone Resources, a fully owned subsidiary of Hancock Prospecting, and delisted from the Australian Securities Exchange on 21 November 2018.

Belinda, Gabon 
In February 2023 Fortescue Metals Group inked in an agreement to develop iron ore at Belinda in Gabon with a road and railway to an existing port.

Diversifying production  
Gold, copper and lithium
In 2017 Fortescue announced they were looking to diversify their portfolio by exploring for metals and minerals in South America and other parts of Australia. Gold, copper and lithium were highlighted as commodities of interest."We continue to undertake early-stage, low-cost exploration on copper gold prospective tenements in South Australia and New South Wales and have assessed high-potential, early-stage exploration tenements in Ecuador, where Fortescue was granted 32 exploration areas."

Infrastructure 

The company has built a mine, a  private railway and a new port at Point Anderson (aka Herb Elliot Port) near Port Hedland. The Fortescue rail line has a flyover over the Mount Newman railway, and a crossing of the BHP Billiton railway. The "first ore on ship" on the line occurred in May 2008, three-and-a-half years after construction started.

The railway's 240-wagon iron ore trains are amongst the heaviest trains in the world. The railway is available to other miners for a fee. Atlas Exports has signed a commercial agreement to use the line and port.

Fortescue had sought access to use this line, but BHP declined. The matter remains in litigation.

The FMG railway uses the up-to-date electronically controlled pneumatic brakes for all its rolling stock.

Shipping fleet 

 Fortescue has an operating fleet of seven ore carriers with an eighth currently in construction. Four of the carriers were built by the Yangzijiang shipyard in Jiangsu, China. The rest of the fleet is being built by Guangzhou Shipyard International.

The current operating fleet is:

 FMG Nicola
 FMG Grace
 FMG Sophia
 FMG Sydney
 FMG Matilda
 FMG David
 FMG Amanda – Arrived in Port Hedland in June 2018. Named after Amanda Bennell, a long-term Aboriginal employee with Fortescue

Fortescue Future Industries 
In 2020, Fortescue Future Industries was created to produce energy in several countries, starting with the 60 MW solar farm at its Chichester Hub.

In October 2021, Fortescue Future Industries and Plug Power Inc. announced a joint venture to build a green hydrogen equipment manufacturing facility in Aldoga, Queensland. The first stage, due for completion in 2022, is expected to double the world's green hydrogen capacity. When the plant is completed, it is expected to be the largest of its type in the world.

Also in October 2021, Fortescue Future Industries and Incitec Pivot announced a feasibility study for a new ammonium nitrate production plant in Brisbane. The plant would use PEM electrolysers to generate hydrogen to produce ammonium nitrate, mainly used as fertiliser and as a component in explosives, replacing the conventional manufacturing process which uses natural gas.

In November 2021 it was announced that Fortescue Future Industries would build a plant in Río Negro Province, Argentina, that initially in 2024 would produce 600 MW of green hydrogen a year, rising to 15GW by 2030.

In March 2022, Fortescue Future Industries acquired UK-based Williams Advanced Engineering (WAE). As part of this acquisition, Fortescue and WAE will jointly develop the world first, zero emission electric Infinity Train that charges itself using the Earth's gravitational force.

Controversy

Misleading and deceptive conduct court case
In late 2004 and early 2005, Fortescue chairman and then-CEO Andrew Forrest made a series of announcements that Fortescue had entered into "binding agreements" with three significant Chinese state-owned entities to build and finance infrastructure for the company. The Australian Securities & Investments Commission took legal action against FMG and Forrest. Although an initial ruling by Justice John Gilmour in 2009 found Forrest hadn't acted in a misleading or deceptive manner, Chief Justice Patrick Keane and judges Arthur Emmett and Raymond Finkelstein of the Federal Court of Australia overturned this decision in 2011, finding that FMG and its Chairman and CEO, Andrew Forrest, had engaged in misleading or deceptive conduct and breached the continuous disclosure provisions in the Corporations Act, 2001, by claiming to have binding contracts with China.

The court found that a Chinese framework agreement does not amount to a binding contract, in the natural meaning of the word. If found to have breached director's duties, Forrest faced the possibility of being banned as a director of an ASIC-listed company. FMG appealed against the decision, and in October 2012, the High Court found in favour of FMG and Forrest, reversing the decision of the full bench of the Federal Court and agreeing with the original 2009 decision by Justice Gilmour. In his judgement, Justice Honour concluded that Fortescue's releases "correctly represented that there was an agreement, and that it was in the view of the parties binding from the time of board approval".

Despite the early announcement, in 2008, the group loaded its first iron ore shipment bound for China. Fortescue have at least ten Chinese steel mill contracts lasting for around ten years. Baosteel was the first company to receive their iron ore.

Opposition to Solomon Hub mining lease

FMG lodged applications for three mining leases in the Solomon Hub area in 2008, and began negotiations with the native title holders through the Yindjibarndi Aboriginal Corporation (YAC). Negotiations broke down and the YAC lodged its opposition to the grant of the three licenses to the Native Title Tribunal in 2009, initially failing to win orders preventing the grant of the licenses. The YAC also failed in its initial Federal Court appeal of that decision last year, and the State Government issued the mining licenses to FMG in late November 2010. Both FMG and the YAC are now waiting on the results of a new appeal to the Full Bench of the Federal Court. The company estimated the extraction of 2.4 billion tons of ore over the next 40 years, worth $280 billion, offering less than a deal struck by Rio Tinto that would provide $2 billion over 40 years.

On 8 April 2011, Slater & Gordon, representing the Yindjibarndi Aboriginal Corporation in its negotiations with FMG, requested FMG compensate the Yindjibarndi community. In March 2011, FMG was accused of supporting a break-off group to divide the local Yindjibarndi community during negotiations for access to traditional Yinjibarndi land for the planned $8.5 billion Solomon Hub project. While the law firm admitted FMG has put compensation money up, it said it was insufficient in comparison with the profits that will be made from this mine on the client's traditional land, as well as the royalty (tax) amounts that have been paid to non-Aboriginal people.

In 2021 negotiations over an Indigenous Land Use Agreement failed, and  the Yindjibarndi Aboriginal Corporation is  leading a native title compensation claim in the Federal Court, asserting that FMG have been mining on Yindjibarndi land without an agreement. According to the National Native Title Tribunal, the Federal Court needs to make a determination on whether the community is eligible for "compensation for the loss, impairment, diminution or extinguishment of native title rights and interests in the area".

Aboriginal engagement
In August 2013, CEO Nev Power announced the company had achieved its target of awarding $1 billion in contracts to Aboriginal business by the end of 2013. Fortescue had made the commitment in 2011 to award $1 billion in contracts to businesses at least 25% owned by Aboriginal Australians through its Billion Opportunities program.

In reaching its target six months early, the company had signed 102 contracts and subcontracts with 50 businesses including $500 million worth of contracts with six Aboriginal joint ventures and Morris Corporation representing the largest-ever package of contracts awarded to Aboriginal businesses. Of the contracts awarded, Fortescue said more than 80% were awarded to Aboriginal businesses that were at least half indigenous owned. Fortescue chairman Andrew Forrest told The Guardian: "The depth of what the Indigenous people have achieved and the change in direction they're taking is really historic."

See also 
 Pilbara railways

References

External links 

 
 Fortescue Future Industries website

 
Mining companies of Australia
Companies based in Perth, Western Australia
Pilbara
Iron ore mining companies of Australia
Holding companies of Australia
Companies listed on the Australian Securities Exchange
Iron ore mining in Western Australia